The 1951–52 Segunda División season was the 21st since its establishment and was played between 8 September 1951 and 13 April 1952.

Overview before the season
32 teams joined the league, including 4 relegated from the 1950–51 La Liga and 4 promoted from the 1950–51 Tercera División.

Relegated from La Liga
Málaga
Murcia
Alcoyano
Lérida

Promoted from Tercera División'''
Atlético Baleares
Caudal
Alavés
Alicante

Group North

Teams

League table

Results

Top goalscorers

Top goalkeepers

Group South

Teams

League table

Results

Top goalscorers

Top goalkeepers

Promotion playoffs

League table

Results

Relegation playoffs

League table

Results

External links
BDFútbol

Segunda División seasons
2
Spain